Mikołaj "Lubelczyk" Kurozwęcki (? - 1507) was a Polish noble and official. He was the Lublin Voivode (1502–1507), and a member of the Poraj heraldic clan.

References

Lublin Voivodes
1507 deaths
Year of birth unknown
Clan of Poraj